Hodos may refer to:

Places
 Hodoš/Hodos, a town and municipality in Eastern Slovenia.
 Vydrany, a village in Slovakia

Romania

See also 
 Hodoș (surname)